Patrick Gallagher may refer to:

Patrick Gallagher (actor) (born 1968), Canadian actor
Patrick Gallagher (designer), American designer
Patrick Gallagher (footballer), soccer player
Patrick Gallagher (politician) (born 1946), former Irish politician with Sinn Féin the Workers' Party, Workers Party of Ireland and Democratic Left
Patrick Gallagher (racing driver), stock car racer
Patrick Gallagher (businessman), Irish property developer and businessman
Patrick D. Gallagher (born 1963), American physicist and chancellor of the University of Pittsburgh
Patrick J. Gallagher (born 1949), president of San Francisco Giants Enterprises
Patrick X. Gallagher, mathematician at Columbia University
Paddy Gallagher (boxer) (born 1989), Northern Irish boxer
Paddy "the Cope" Gallagher (1873–1966), founder of The Cope, or the Templecrone Agricultural Co-operative Society
J. Patrick Gallagher Jr, American chief executive
Patrick Gallagher, US Marine and namesake of the destroyer

See also
Pat Gallagher (disambiguation)
Hugh Gallacher (footballer, born 1870) (1870–1941), Scottish footballer, known as "Paddy"
Pat Gallacher (1881–1951), Scottish footballer
Pat Gallacher (footballer, born 1913) (1913–1983), Scottish footballer
Patrick Gallacher (1909–1992), Scottish footballer (Sunderland)
Patsy Gallacher (1891–1953), Irish footballer (Celtic)